Sir Percy Wilson Newson, 1st Baronet (4 April 1874 – 17 May 1950) was a British banker and jute merchant in India.

Newson was born in Suffolk, the son of Georgina Martha and William Henry Newson. He was senior partner with Jardine, Skinner & Co in Calcutta and also became president of the Bank of Bengal in 1920 and Governor of the Imperial Bank of India in 1921. He was knighted in the 1920 New Year Honours and created a baronet in the 1921 Birthday Honours. He served as Conservative Member of Parliament for Tamworth from 1922 to 1923. He was the maternal grandfather of English explorer Ranulph Fiennes.

References

External links 
 

1874 births
1950 deaths
Businesspeople from Suffolk
British bankers
Indian bankers
Businesspeople from Kolkata
Baronets in the Baronetage of the United Kingdom
Knights Bachelor
UK MPs 1922–1923
Conservative Party (UK) MPs for English constituencies